The East Anglian Cup was a football competition that embraced East Anglian clubs in Essex, Norfolk and Suffolk, but also included clubs from a much wider geographical area, from Boston and Louth in Lincolnshire down to Oxford City, Chelsea and Gillingham in the South, plus Hertfordshire, Bedfordshire and Cambridgeshire teams as well. Amateur teams and the lower sides of professional clubs competed alongside each other in a long-running competition.

It was originally started as the South East Anglian League in 1903 with three clubs from Colchester, (Town, Crown and Garrison), Ipswich Town and Harwich & Parkeston. The number of teams competing grew gradually and the “South” part of the name was dropped and the competition continued until the First World War. After the War it was competed for as the East Anglian Cup for the first time in 1920/21, whilst the East Anglian League continued until it merged with the Norfolk & Suffolk League in 1964 to form the current Anglian Combination.

From 1921 to 1939 the rules limited membership to 16 clubs and it continued during the Second World War, whilst most football was suspended, providing competition for RAF teams, works sides and top amateur clubs of the time. Post War expansion saw the limit on numbers eventually removed in 1960 and the draw was made on a geographical basis to prevent large distances being travelled. The matches were arranged by mutual agreement between clubs and usually consisted of two rounds, an area semi-final, an area final, with the four winners meeting in the semi-finals and final. The competition lasted over a hundred years but seems to have fallen out of favour with the last final taking place in 2009.

Norwich City were the most successful team in the history of the East Anglian Cup with 12 victories from the early days to the 1920s and a treble in the late 1970s/early 1980s.  Cambridge were the next most successful with 6 wins as Cambridge Town plus four more when they had changed their name to Cambridge City. King's Lynn and Romford were next with 5 apiece, although one for Romford includes their modern incarnation.

Competition winners

References 

East Anglian Football Cup Competition Official Handbook 1983-84.
Roe, Keith (2007) The Essex Senior League: A Statistical Journey 1971-2007 pages 272-4.
The Bureau of Non-League Football Volume 3 1983 to Volume 9 1990.
The Cherry Red Non-League Newsdesk Annual 2004 to 2008.
Various club websites and Wikipedia entries.

Recurring sporting events established in 1903
Football cup competitions in England
1903 establishments in England